English Martyrs School may refer to:

English Martyrs Catholic School, Leicester, UK
English Martyrs RC Primary School, Trafford, UK
English Martyrs School and Sixth Form College, Hartlepool, UK